Allied Forces Baltic Approaches (BALTAP) was a Principal Subordinate Command (PSC) of the NATO Military Command Structure, with responsibility for the Baltic Sea area. It was in existence from 1962 to 2002 and consisted of the Danish Armed Forces, units of the West German Bundeswehr and allied wartime reinforcements.

The NATO command Baltic Approaches was created on 8 January 1962, with headquarters in Karup, Denmark. It was created at Germany's urging, in order to end the previous separation of the German naval forces between the NATO commands Northern Europe and Central Europe. After the changes in the international security situation in 1990, the command was restructured in 1993 and deactivated in 2002.

The area of responsibility of BALTAP comprised the territory of Denmark (without Greenland and the Faroe Islands), the German states Hamburg and Schleswig-Holstein and the eastern North Sea, the Baltic approaches with Skagerrak, Kattegat, the Danish straits, and the Baltic Sea. One peculiarity was the responsibility for air defence over the German part of the BALTAP area. Until 1990, the western Allies were responsible for air defence over the whole Federal Republic of Germany on the basis of the occupation statute. After France had withdrawn from the integrated military structure of the alliance, this task was undertaken by the United States and the United Kingdom. The Second Allied Tactical Air Force (2 ATAF) was responsible for the area of Schleswig-Holstein and Hamburg, and was led by a British officer from RAF Germany, with headquarters in Mönchengladbach.

BALTAP was led by a Danish officer with the rank of a Lieutenant General or a Vice Admiral, who had the designation Commander Allied Forces Baltic Approaches (COMBALTAP). His deputy was a German officer of the same rank. From 1962 to 1993, COMBALTAP was under the NATO command Allied Forces Northern Europe (AFNORTH) in Kolsås outside Oslo in Norway. After a change in the NATO structure, it was placed under Allied Forces Central Europe (AFCENT) on 1 October 1993. For the operational command of the air and sea forces, a partial assignment of these forces to Allied Forces Northwestern Europe (AFNORTHWEST) with its component commands AIRNORTHWEST and NAVNORTHWEST was made.

In case of war, COMBALTAP would have had to lead the NATO forces assigned to it. According to plans, all Danish forces with the exception of some units in the outer regions were to be placed under COMBALTAP. Germany had provided for its land and air forces stationed in the BALTAP area, and its entire naval and naval air forces, to be subordinated to COMBALTAP. In addition, external reinforcements from the United States and Britain (UK Mobile Force, primarily 1st Infantry Brigade) were planned.

1962 to 1993
The structure that was brought into being with the creation of BALTAP remained with few changes from 1962 to 1994. During this time, BALTAP comprised 4 subordinate commands:

  Commander, Allied Land Forces Schleswig-Holstein and Jutland (COMLANDJUT) in Rendsburg 
  Commander, Allied Land Forces in Zealand (COMLANDZEALAND) in Ringsted 
  Commander, Allied Air Forces Baltic Approaches (COMAIRBALTAP) in Karup 
  Commander, Allied Naval Forces Baltic Approaches (COMNAVBALTAP) in Karup

Structure in 1989

Commander, Allied Land Forces Schleswig-Holstein and Jutland

LANDJUT was tasked with defending the Jutland peninsula. Holding Jutland was crucial for the mission of NAVBALTAP to keep the Danish Straits blocked and thus prevent the Soviet Baltic Fleet from breaking out into the North Sea. In case the Jutland peninsula would fall into Soviet hands, the LANDZEALAND units defending the Danish Isles would have been dangerously flanked. Therefore, LANDJUT was to be reinforced at the earliest with British and American troops to ensure that advancing Soviet forces would be prevented from crossing the Kiel Canal and Eider river.

British and American formations earmarked to reinforce LANDJUT included the British 1st Infantry Brigade  and the American 9th Infantry Division. British infantry battalions and armoured regiments rotated every two years or so; thus locations are shown, but no unit identities.

 Commander, Allied Land Forces Schleswig-Holstein and Jutland, Rendsburg, commanded by a Danish or German lieutenant general:
 610th Signal Battalion, Rendsburg
 2nd Signal Battalion, Tønder
 Corps Artillery
 HQ-Staff Battery, Flensburg
 33rd Artillery Battalion, Skive, Nørrejyske Artilleriregiment (24x M59 155 mm gun)
 650th Rocket Artillery Battalion, Flensburg, (4x Lance missile launcher)
 610th Security Battalion (Reserve), Flensburg
 611th Nuclear Weapons Supply Company, Flensburg
 600th Air Defence Regiment, Rendsburg
 Staff Company, 600th Air Defence Regiment, Rendsburg
 610th Air Defence Battalion, Rendsburg, (18x Roland missile systems mounted Marder 1, 108 FIM-43 Redeye launchers)
 620th Air Defence Battalion (Reserve), Rendsburg, (18x Gepard, 108 FIM-43 Redeye launchers)
 630th Air Defence Battalion (Reserve), Rendsburg, (24x  Bofors 40L70)
 Jutland Battle Group (Reserve), Holstebro
 7th Staff Company
 4th Btn, Jydske Dragonregiment, (infantry) 
 3rd Btn, Kongens Jyske Fodregiment, (Infantry) 
 4th Btn, Prinsens Livregiment, (Infantry)
 Tank destroyer Squadron, (10x Centurion Mk V (84mm gun)) 
 7th Engineer Company
 8th Artillery Btn, Nørrejyske Artilleriregiment, (18x M101 105 mm howitzer)
 8th Logistic Battalion
 7th Military Police Detachment
 1st Infantry Brigade, Tidworth, UK, United Kingdom Mobile Force
 HQ 1st Infantry Brigade & 215th Signal Squadron, Royal Signals, Tidworth
 13th/18th Royal Hussars, Tidworth, (24x FV101 Scorpion, 24x FV107 Scimitar, 16x FV102 Striker, 19x FV103 Spartan)
 1st Btn, Queen's Regiment, Tidworth, (43x Saxon, 8x FV721 Fox, 8x 81mm Mortars)
 1st Btn, Devonshire and Dorset Regiment, Bulford, (43x Saxon, 8x FV721 Fox, 8x 81mm Mortars)
 1st Btn, Royal Hampshire Regiment, Tidworth, (43x Saxon, 8x FV721 Fox, 8x 81mm Mortars)
 1st Btn, Wessex Regiment (V), Devizes
 C Squadron, Royal Hussars (Prince of Wales Own), Tidworth, (14x Chieftain tanks)
 47th Field Regiment, Royal Artillery, Thorney Island, (24x FH-70 howitzers)
 22nd Engineer Regiment, Royal Engineers, Perham Down
 No. 656 (Anti-Tank Helicopter) Squadron, Army Air Corps, (3x Gazelle AH.1, 9x Lynx AH.1), from 7 Regiment, Army Air Corps

Jutland Division 
 Jutland Division, Fredericia
 3rd Signal Battalion (Division HQ)
 3rd Engineer Battalion 
 4th Battalion, Fynske Livregiment, (Motorised infantry Battalion: 10x Centurion Mk V (84mm gun))
 6th Battalion, Jydske Dragonregiment, (Tank destroyer Battalion: 50x Centurion Mk V (84mm gun))
 5th Battalion, Jydske Dragonregiment, (Reconnaissance: 18x M41 DK-1, 9x M113, 9x M125)
 Long Range Reconnaissance Company, Dronningens Livregiment
 Electronic Warfare Company
 1st Jutland Brigade, Fredericia
 1st Brigade Staff Company (including 5x M113, 8x TOW on Land Rover)
 1st Battalion, Jydske Dragonregiment, (20x Leopard 1A3, 21x M113 (including 4 with TOW), 4x M125 mortar carriers, 2x TOW on Land Rover)
 1st Battalion, Fynske Livregiment, (10x Leopard 1A3, 32x M113 (including 4 with TOW), 4x M125, 4x TOW on Land Rover)
 2nd Battalion, Prinsens Livregiment, (10x Leopard 1A3, 32x M113 (including 4 with TOW), 4x M125, 4x TOW on Land Rover)
 6th Artillery Battalion, Nørrejyske Artilleriregiment, (12x M109A3 howitzer, 8x M114/39 155mm howitzer, 15x M113)
 1st Armoured Engineer Company (6 x M113)
 4th Logistic Battalion
 1st Military Police Detachment
 2nd Jutland Brigade, Skive
 2nd Brigade Staff Company (including 5x M113, 8x TOW on Land Rover)
 2nd Battalion, Jydske Dragonregiment, (20x Leopard 1A3, 21x M113 (including 4 with TOW), 2x M125)
 1st Battalion, Dronningens Livregiment, (10x Leopard 1A3, 32x M113 (including 4 with TOW), 4x M125, 4x TOW on Land Rover)
 2nd Battalion, Dronningens Livregiment, (10x Leopard 1A3, 32x M113 (including 4 with TOW), 4x M125, 4x TOW on Land Rover) 
 3rd Artillery Battalion, Nørrejyske Artilleriregiment, (12x M109A3 howitzer, 8x M114/39 155mm howitzer, 15x M113)
 2nd Armoured Engineer Company
 5th Logistic Battalion
 2nd Military Police Detachment
 3rd Jutland Brigade, Haderslev
 3rd Brigade Staff Company (including 5x M113, 8x TOW on Land Rover)
 3rd Battalion, Jydske Dragonregiment, (20x Leopard 1A3, 21x M113 (including 4 with TOW), 2x M125)
 1st Battalion, Prinsens Livregiment, (10x Leopard 1A3, 32x M113 (including 4 with TOW), 4x M125, 4x TOW on Land Rover)
 1st Battalion, Kongens Jyske Fodregiment, (10x Leopard 1A3, 32x M113 (including 4 with TOW), 4x M125, 4x TOW on Land Rover)
 7th Artillery Battalion, Sønderjyske Artilleriregiment, (12x M109A3 howitzer, 8x M114/39 howitzer, 15x M113)
 3rd Armoured Engineer Company
 7th Logistic Battalion
 3rd Military Police Detachment
 Divisional Artillery Regiment Skive
 Staff and Target Acquisition Battery 
 23rd Artillery Battalion, (18x M114/39 155mm howitzer)
 24th Artillery Battalion, (18x M114/39 155mm howitzer)
 18th Heavy Battery, (4x M115 203mm howitzer)
 19th Heavy Battery, (4x M115 203mm howitzer)
 14th Air Defence Battalion, (Stinger, Bofors 40 mm L/70)
 Divisional Logistic Ålborg
 3rd Logistic Battalion
 10th Supply Battalion
 Heavy Transport Company
 2nd Military Police Company

6th Panzergrenadier Division 
 6th Panzergrenadier Division, Neumünster
 Staff Company, 6th Panzergrenadier Division, Neumünster
 16th Panzergrenadier Brigade, Wentorf
 Staff Company, 16th Panzergrenadier Brigade, Wentorf, (8x M577, 8x Luchs)
 161st Panzergrenadier Battalion, Wentorf, (13x Leopard 1A1A1, 24x Marder, 12x M113)
 162nd Panzergrenadier Battalion, Wentorf, (24x Marder, 6x Panzermörser, 23x M113)
 163rd Panzergrenadier Battalion, Wentorf, (24x Marder, 6x Panzermörser, 23x M113)
 164th Panzer Battalion, Schwarzenbek, (41x Leopard 1A1A1, 12x M113)
 165th Panzer Artillery Battalion, Wentorf, (18x M109A3G)
 160th Anti-Tank Company, Schwarzenbek, (12x Jaguar 2)
 160th Armored Engineer Company, Schwarzenbek
 160th Supply Company, Wentorf
 160th Maintenance Company, Schwarzenbek
 17th Panzergrenadier Brigade, Hamburg
 Staff Company, 17th Panzergrenadier Brigade, Hamburg, (8x M577, 8x Luchs)
 171st Panzergrenadier Battalion, Hamburg, (13x Leopard 1A1A2, 24x Marder, 12x M113)
 172nd Panzergrenadier Battalion, Lübeck, (24x Marder, 6x Panzermörser, 23x M113)
 173rd Panzergrenadier Battalion, Hamburg, (24x Marder, 6x Panzermörser, 23x M113)
 174th Panzer Battalion, Hamburg, (41x Leopard 1A1A2, 12x M113)
 177th Panzer Artillery Battalion, Hamburg, (18x M109A3G)
 170th Anti-Tank Company, Lübeck, (12x Jaguar 1)
 170th Armored Engineer Company, Lübeck
 170th Supply Company, Hamburg
 170th Maintenance Company, Hamburg
 18th Panzer Brigade, Neumünster
 Staff Company, 18th Panzer Brigade, Neumünster, (8x M577, 8x Luchs)
 181st Panzer Battalion, Neumünster, (28x Leopard 1A2, 6x Marder, 12x M113)
 182nd Panzergrenadier Battalion, Bad Segeberg, (35x Marder, 6x Panzermörser, 12x M113)
 183rd Panzer Battalion, Boostedt, (41x Leopard 1A2, 12x M113)
 184th Panzer Battalion, Boostedt, (41x Leopard 1A2, 12x M113)
 185th Panzer Artillery Battalion, Boostedt, (18x M109A3G)
 180th Anti-Tank Company, Bad Segeberg, (12x Jaguar 1)
 180th Armored Engineer Company, Lübeck
 180th Supply Company, Boostedt
 180th Maintenance Company, Boostedt
 51st Home Defence Brigade, Eutin (originally a brigade of the Territorial Army; it was partially activated and staffed in 1982 and subordinated to the 6th  Division as reinforcement in 1985)
 Staff Company, 51st Home Defence Brigade, Eutin, (8x M577, 8x Luchs)
 511th Jäger Battalion, Flensburg, (7x Leopard 1A1A2, 6x Panzermörser)
 512th Jäger Battalion, Putlos, (7x Leopard 1A1A2, 30x M113, 6x Panzermörser)
 513th Panzer Battalion, Flensburg, (41x Leopard 1A1A2, 12x M113)
 514th Panzer Battalion (Reserve), Putlos, (41x Leopard 1A1A2, 12x M113)
 515th Field Artillery Battalion, Kellinghusen, (18x M101)
 517th Field Replacement Battalion, Süderbrarup
 510th Armored Engineer Company, Plön
 510th Medical Company, Idstedt
 510th Supply Company, Schleswig
 510th Maintenance Company, Schleswig
 6th Artillery Regiment, Kellinghusen
 Staff Battery, 6th Artillery Regiment, Kellinghusen
 61st Field Artillery Battalion, Albersdorf, (18x M110A2, 18x FH-70)
 62nd Rocket Artillery Battalion, Kellinghusen, (16x LARS, 16x MLRS)
 63rd Surveillance Battalion, Itzehoe, (12x CL-89 drones)
 6th Custodial Battery, Kellinghusen
 6th Army Aviation Regiment, Hohenlockstedt, (15x BO-105M, 24x UH-1D, 21x PAH-1)
 6th Air Defence Regiment, Lütjenburg, (36x Gepard, 216x FIM-43 Redeye launchers)
 6th Armored Reconnaissance Battalion, Eutin, (34x Leopard 1A1A1, 10x Luchs, 18x Fuchs - 9 of which carry a RASIT radar)
 6th Engineer Battalion, Plön, (8x Biber AVLB, 8x Pionierpanzer 1, 4x Skorpion Mine Layers, 12x Floating Bridge Modules)
 61st Engineer Battalion, Lübeck, (8x Biber AVLB, 8x Pionierpanzer 1, 4x Skorpion Mine Layers, 12x Floating Bridge Modules)
 6th Signal Battalion, Neumünster
 6th Medical Battalion, Itzehoe
 6th Supply Battalion, Neumünster
 6th Maintenance Battalion, Hamburg
 5x Field Replacement Battalions: 61st and 65th in Neumünster, 62nd in Itzehoe, 63rd and 64th in Hamburg
 66th Jäger Battalion (aktiv), Wentorf, (30x M113, 6x Panzermörser)
 67th Jäger Battalion (aktiv), Breitenburg, (30x M113, 6x Panzermörser)
 68th Security Battalion (Reserve), Breitenburg

Territorial Command Schleswig-Holstein 
 Territorial Command Schleswig-Holstein, Kiel
 Staff Company, Territorial Command Schleswig-Holstein, Kiel
 600th Front Intelligence Company (Reserve),  Neumünster
 61st Home Defence Brigade, Idstedt
 Staff Company (Reserve), 61st Home Defence Brigade, Idstedt
 611th Infantry Battalion (Reserve), Klein Wittensee, (7x Leopard 1A1A1)
 612th Infantry Battalion (Reserve), Flensburg, (7x Leopard 1A1A1)
 613th Panzer Battalion (Reserve), Hamburg, (41x Leopard 1A1A1, 12x M113)
 615th Artillery Battalion (Reserve), Hamburg, (18x M101)
 610th Engineer Company (Reserve), Idstedt
 71st Home Defence Regiment, Neumünster
 Staff Company (Reserve), 71st Home Defence Regiment, Neumünster
 711th Infantry Battalion (Reserve), Neumünster
 712th Infantry Battalion (Reserve), Seeth
 713th Infantry Battalion (Reserve), Albersdorf
 710th Mortar Company (Reserve), Neumünster, (18x 120mm mortars)
 710th Supply Company (Reserve), Neumünster
 81st Home Defence Regiment, Süderlügum
 Staff Company (Reserve), 81st Home Defence Regiment, Süderlügum
 811th Infantry Battalion (Reserve), Süderbrarup
 812th Infantry Battalion (Reserve), Idstedt
 813th Infantry Battalion (Reserve), Eutin
 810th Mortar Company (Reserve), Süderlügum, (18x 120mm mortars)
 810th Supply Company (Reserve), Süderlügum
 60th Engineer Regiment, Klein Wittensee
 Staff Company (Reserve), 60th Engineer Regiment, Klein Wittensee
 620th Engineer Battalion, Schleswig
 630th Engineer Battalion (Reserve), Albersdorf
 640th Engineer Battalion (Reserve), Idstedt
 650th Engineer Battalion, Rendsburg, (8x Biber AVLB, 8x Pionierpanzer 1, 4x Skorpion Mine Layers, 12x Floating Bridge Modules)
 660th Floating Bridging Battalion, Schleswig
 670th Floating Bridging Battalion (Reserve), Albersdorf
 600th Pipeline Engineer Battalion (Reserve), Idstedt
 600th Amphibious Engineer Company, Plön  
 600th Signal Company (Reserve), Klein Wittensee
 600th Signal Command, Kiel
 Staff Company, 600th Signal Command, Kiel
 620th Signal Battalion, Flensburg
 600th Medical Command, Neumünster
 Staff Company, 600th Medical Command, Neumünster
 610th Medical Battalion, Itzehoe
 6x Medical Transport Companies, 6x Field Clinics, 55x Field Hospitals
 600th Supply Command, Flensburg
 Staff Company, 600th Supply Command, Flensburg
 610th Transport Battalion, Heide
 610th Supply Battalion, Seeth
 620th Supply Battalion (Reserve), Süderlügum
 610th Maintenance Battalion, Flensburg
 60th Field Replacement Regiment, Rendsburg
 Staff Company (Reserve), 60th Field Replacement Regiment, Rendsburg
 602nd Field Replacement Battalion (Reserve), Rendsburg
 603rd Field Replacement Battalion (Reserve), Rendsburg
 604th Field Replacement Battalion (Reserve), Rendsburg
 610th Military Police Battalion, Heide
 600th Army Aviation Squadron (Reserve), Hohenlockstedt
 610th NBC Defence Battalion, Albersdorf
 610th Field Replacement Battalion (Reserve), Husum
 620th Field Replacement Battalion (Reserve), Idelstedt
 6x Training Battalions
 10x Home Defence Companies

Territorial Command Jutland and Funen 
All territorial army units were part of the reserve.

 Territorial Command Jutland and Funen (VLK) in Fredericia
 5th Signal Battalion
 5th Engineer Battalion
 LRRP Company (SEP/VLK (Homeguard))
 Host and Support Battalion (Supporting arrival of NATO reinforcements in Jutland and northern Germany)
 Rear and Sustainment Battalion  
 Logistics Support Group West (LSG-W)
 Supply Battalion
 Transport Battalion 
 Medical Battalion (incl. Medical Train)
 Maintenance Battalion 
 Field Replacement Commando
 1st Territorial Region (Northern Jutland) in Aalborg
 3rd Btn, Dronningens Livregiment, (Infantry)
 15th Light Battery, Nørrejyske Artilleriregiment (8x M101 105mm howitzer)
 Engineer Company
 6x Homeguard Districts
 6x Homeguard Staff Companies
 31x Area Companies
 6x Homeguard Military Police Companies
 2nd Territorial Region (Middle Jutland) in Viborg
 3rd Btn, Prinsens Livregiment, (Infantry)
 9th Light Battery, Nørrejyske Artilleriregiment (8x M101 105mm howitzer) 
 Engineer Company
 10x Homeguard Districts
 10x Homeguard Staff Companies
 56x Area Companies
 10x Homeguard Military Police Companies
 3rd Territorial Region (Southern Jutland) in Haderslev
 2nd Btn, Kongens Jyske Fodregiment, (Infantry)
 3rd Btn, Slesvigske Fodregiment, (Infantry) 
 10th Artillery Battalion (Reserve), Varde, Sønderjyske Artilleriregiment  (16x M101 105mm howitzer)
 Engineer Company
 11x Homeguard Districts
 11x Homeguard Staff companies
 53x Area Companies
 11x Homeguard Military Police Companies
 4th Territorial Region (Funen) in Odense
 2nd Btn, Fynske Livregiment, (Motorized Infantry) incl Two Tank destroyer Squadron, (2x12 Centurion Mk V (84 mm gun))
 3rd Btn, Fynske Livregiment, (Infantry)
 11th Artillery Battalion (Reserve), Varde, Sønderjyske Artilleriregiment  (16x M101 105mm howitzer)
 Engineer Company
 5x Homeguard Districts
 5x Homeguard staff companies
 32x Area Companies
 5x Homeguard Military Police Companies

Commander, Allied Land Forces Zealand

LANDZEALAND was tasked with defending the Danish Isles incl. Bornholm and preventing Warsaw Pact troops from amphibious landings. Order of battle in 1988.

 Commander, Allied Land Forces in Zealand (ELK), Ringsted, commanded by a Danish lieutenant general:
 1st Signal Battalion
 1st Engineer Battalion
 3rd Btn, Gardehusarregimentet, (Reconnaissance: 18x M41 DK-1, 12x M113, 9x M125)
 Electronic Warfare Company
 LRRP Company (SEP/ELK (Homeguard))
 9th Logistic Battalion 
 1st Zealand Brigade
 4th Brigade Staff Company (5x M113, 8x TOW on Land Rover)
 1st Btn, Gardehusarregimentet, (30x Centurion Mk5/2.DK(105mm L7 gun), 25xM113(incl 4 with TOW), 2xM125)
 2nd Btn, Danske Livregiment, (Mechanised Infantry - 10x Centurion (105mm L7 gun), 46x M113 (including 4 with TOW), 6x M106, 4 TOW on Land Rover)
 1st Btn, Sjællandske Livregiment, (Mechanised Infantry - 10x Centurion (105mm L7 gun), 46x M113 (including 4 with TOW), 6x M106, 4 TOW on Land Rover)
 4th Btn, Den Kongelige Livgarde, (Light Infantry)
 1st Btn, Kongens Artilleriregiment, (12x M109A3, 8x M114/39, 14xM113 (1 x Kommando(BAO) 6 x Artilleryobserver 4 x SKC and 1xGreenarcher)))
 4th  Armoured Engineer Company
 1st Logistic Battalion 
 4th Military Police Detachment 
 2nd Zealand Brigade
 5th Brigade Staff Company (5x M113, 8x TOW on Land Rover)
 2nd Btn, Sjællandske Livregiment, (30x Centurion Mk5/2.DK(105mm L7 gun), 25xM113(incl 4 with TOW), 2xM125) 
 1st Btn, Danske Livregiment, (Mechanised Infantry - 10x Centurion (105mm L7 gun), 46x M113 (including 4 with TOW), 6x M106, 4 TOW on Land Rover)
 1st Btn, Den Kongelige Livgarde, (Mechanised Infantry - 10x Centurion (105mm L7 gun), 46x M113 (including 4 with TOW), 6x M106, 4 TOW on Land Rover)
 5th Btn, Sjællandske Livregiment, (Light Infantry)
 5th Btn, Kongens Artilleriregiment, (12x M109A3, 8x M114/39, 14xM113 (1 x Kommando(BAO) 6 x Artillery observer 4 x SKC and 1xGreenarcher)))
 5th Armoured Engineer Company
 2nd Logistic Battalion 
 5th Military Police Detachment
 1st Zealand Battle Group (Reserve)
 Staff Company, (Den Kongelige Livgarde)
 1st Antitank Squadron Gardehusarregimentet, (8x Centurion MkV (84 mm gun))
 2nd Btn, Den Kongelige Livgarde, (Infantry)
 3rd Btn, Den Kongelige Livgarde, (Infantry)
 16th Artillery Battalion, (16x M101) (Forkert antal alle 4 105mm afdelinger havde enten 18 eller 24 rør 3 x 6 /3 x 8) 
 Logistic Company
 2nd Zealand Battle Group (Reserve)
 Staff Company, (Gardehusarregimentet)
 2nd Antitank Squadron, Gardehusarregimentet, (8x Centurion MkV (84 mm gun))
 2nd Btn, Gardehusarregimentet, (Infantry)
 4th Btn, Gardehusarregimentet, (Infantry)
 22nd Artillery Battalion, (16x M101)
 3rd Zealand Battle Group (Reserve)
 Staff Company, (Danske Livregiment)
 3rd Antitank Squadron Gardehusarregimentet, (8x Centurion MkV (84 mm gun))
 3rd Btn, Danske Livregiment, (Infantry)
 4th Btn, Danske Livregiment, (Infantry)
 21st Artillery Battalion, (16x M101)
 Logistic Company
 4th Zealand Battle Group (Reserve)
 4th Antitank Squadron, Gardehusarregimentet, (8x Centurion MkV (84 mm gun))
 Staff Company, (Sjællandske Livregiment)
 3rd Btn, Sjællandske Livregiment, (Infantry)
 4th Btn, Sjællandske Livregiment, (Infantry)
 4th Artillery Battalion, (16x M101)
 Logistic Company
 Corps Artillery
 Staff and Target Acquisition Battery 
 2nd Artillery Battalion, (18x M114/39 155 mm howitzer)
 32nd Artillery Battalion, (18x M114/39 155 mm howitzer) 
 17th Heavy Battery, (4x M115 203mm howitzer)
 13th Air Defence Battalion, (Stinger)
 Corps Logistic  
 6th Logistic Battalion
 6th Military Police Company

Bornholms Værn 
The island of Bornholm was in wartime independent, due to the long distance from Zealand and agreements after World War II said that no foreign units could reinforce Bornholm.
Therefore, Bornholm had only the Battlegroup and homeguard units of the 7th Territorial Region.

 Bornholms Værn's Battle Group 
 Staff and Signal Company
 1st Battalion, Bornholms Værn (infantry) (4x TOW on Land Rover)
 2nd Battalion, Bornholms Værn (infantry) (reserve) (4x TOW on Land Rover)
 3rd Battalion, Bornholms Værn (infantry) (reserve) (12 x 106 mm RR on Jeep M38)
 Light Tank Squadron,"Bornholm Dragoons" (10x M41 DK-1)
 Light Reconnaissance Squadron (6x M41 DK-1)
 12th Artillery Battalion (18x M101)
 Air Defence Battery (Stinger)
 Bornholm Engineer Company
 Logistic Company

 Territorial Commander, Allied Land Forces in Zealand 
Except for the Royal Guard Company and the Mounted Hussar Squadron, which were made up of conscripts, all territorial units were part of the reserve:

 Territorial Command, Allied Land Forces in Zealand (ELK) in Ringsted
 Host and Support Battalion (Supporting arrival of NATO reinforcements on Zealand)
 Logistics Support Group East (LSG-E)
 Supply Battalion
 Transport Company 
 Medical Battalion 
 Maintenance Battalion 
 Field Replacement Commando
 5th Territorial Region (Zealand) in Ringsted
 5th Btn Den Sjællandske Livregiment, (Infantry)
 5th Region Engineer Company
 9x Homeguard Districts
 9x Homeguard Staff Companies
 50x Area Companies
 9x Homeguard Military Police Companies
 6th Territorial Region (Northern Zealand/Copenhagen) in Copenhagen
 4th Btn Den Kongelige Livgarde, (Infantry, 6 compagnies) (Northern Zealand/Copenhagen)
 Guard Company (Vagtkompagniet), Den Kongelige Livgarde, (Infantry) (Copenhagen, city)
 Mounted Hussar Squadron (Hesteeskadronen), Gardehusarregimentet, (Infantry) (Copenhagen, city)
 6th Region Engineer Company
 4x Homeguard Districts (Northern Zealand)
 4x Homeguard Staff Companies
 29x Area Companies
 4x Homeguard Military Police Companies
  ? x Homeguard Districts (Copenhagen)
  ? x Homeguard Staff Company 
  ? x Area Company
  ? x Homeguard Military Police Company
 7th Territorial Region (Bornholm) 1x Homeguard District
 Homeguard Staff Company
 5x Homeguard Area Companies
 Homeguard Military Police Company

Commander, Air Forces, Baltic Approaches
Allied Air Forces Baltic Approaches (AIRBALTAP) was a NATO military formation under Allied Forces Baltic Approaches tasked with providing air support in the BALTAP area of operations. AIRBALTAP commanded all flying units based within its sector and all reinforcements flying into its sector, as well as ground-based radar systems and stations, air defence units and the airfields in its sector. The commander of AIRBALTAP was the commander in chief of the Royal Danish Air Force. AIRBALTAP was formed in 1962 with its area of responsibility covering Germany north of the river Elbe and Denmark with the surrounding seas; however air defence for the German state of Schleswig-Holstein was the responsibility of Second Allied Tactical Air Force

The peacetime headquarters of AIRBALTAP were at Karup in Denmark. AIRBALTAP commanded the Royal Danish Air Force and flying units of the German Luftwaffe and Marine, as well as extensive air defence and radar installations manned by German and Danish personnel.

If needed AIRBALTAP would have been reinforced with units from the US Third (UK based), Eighth (reconnaissance and bombing), Ninth (immediate reinforcements) and Twelfth Air Force (follow on reinforcements), and with Royal Air Force units. At the start of hostilities AIRBALTAP would have had immediately almost 300 combat planes at its disposal. The following units would have come under AIRBALTAP in wartime in 1989:

AIRBALTAP was disbanded in 1993.

 War Time Structure c.1989 

 AIRBALTAP in Karup, commanded by a Danish lieutenant general:
 Royal Danish Air Force Aalborg Air Base
 Eskadrille 723, 16× F-16A
 Eskadrille 726, 16× F-16A
 Karup Air Base
 Eskadrille 725, 20× F-35 Draken strike fighter, 5× TF-35 Draken
 Eskadrille 729, 20× RF-35 Draken reconnaissance fighter, 5× TF-35 Draken
 Tirstrup Air Base 
 Co-located Operating Base to be reinforced by USAF/RAF squadrons 
 Vandel Air Base
 Co-located Operating Base to be reinforced by USAF/RAF squadrons 
 Army Air Corps (only in peacetime)
 Skrydstrup Air Base
 Eskadrille 727, 16× F-16A
 Eskadrille 730, 16× F-16A 
 Værløse Air Base
 Eskadrille 721, transport aircraft (3× C-130H Hercules)
 Eskadrille 722, search and rescue helicopters (8× S-61A)
 Air Defence Command East, Skalstrup Air Station 
 Eskadrille 541, Stevns Fort, with 1× I-Hawk battery (6× launchers)
 Eskadrille 542, Kongelund Fort near Aflangshagen Air Station, with 1× I-Hawk battery (6× launchers)
 Eskadrille 543, Sigerslev Air Station, with 1× I-Hawk battery (6× launchers)
 Eskadrille 544, Tune near Skalstrup Air Station, with 1× I-Hawk battery (6× launchers)
 Air Defence Command West, Karup Air Base
 Eskadrille 531, Odense, with 1× I-Hawk battery (6× launchers)
 Eskadrille 532, Odense, with 1× I-Hawk battery (6× launchers)
 Eskadrille 533, Skrydstrup Air Base, with 1× I-Hawk battery (6× launchers)
 Eskadrille 534, Karup Air Base, with 1× I-Hawk battery (6× launchers)
 Luftwaffe Husum Air Base
 Jagdbombergeschwader 41, 2x squadrons with 18x Alpha Jets each, and 8x Alpha Jets in reserve
 Leck Air Base
 Aufklärungsgeschwader 52, 2x squadrons with 15x RF-4E (Reconnaissance)
 144th Air Defence Missile Squadron (Reserve), Alt Duvenstedt, with 4x Roland systems
 Marine Marinefliegerdivision, Kiel Air Base
 Schleswig Air Base
 Marinefliegergeschwader 1, 2x squadrons with 24x Tornado IDS each
 Air Defence Squadron 1, Kropp, with 6x Roland systems
 Eggebek Air Base
 Marinefliegergeschwader 2, 2x squadrons with 24x Tornado IDS each
 Air Defence Squadron 2, Tarp, with 6x Roland systems
 Nordholz Airbase, tasked with submarine hunting in the North Sea
 Marinefliegergeschwader 3, 2x squadrons with a total of 20x Breguet Atlantic (15x maritime patrol and 5x BR 1150M signals intelligence variant), 1x squadron with 19x Sea Lynx Mk88 helicopters for Navy's destroyers and frigates
 Air Defence Squadron 3, Nordholz, with 6x Roland systems

 Commander, Allied Naval Forces Baltic Approaches 
Allied Naval Forces Baltic Approaches (NAVBALTAP) was located until 1976 in Kiel-Holtenau, and thereafter at Karup. Its commander was a Danish or German vice admiral and had the following deputy commanders:

 Flag Officer Denmark (FOD) in Aarhus, simultaneously the national commander of the Danish fleet. Task Force designation 420.
 Flag Officer Germany (FOG) in Glücksburg, simultaneously the national commander of the German fleet. Task Force designation 500.
 Commander German North Sea Subarea (COMGERNORSEA) in Wilhelmshaven-Sengwarden, simultaneously the German national Commander Naval Forces North Sea (Befehlshaber der Seestreitkräfte der Nordsee (BSN)).

The task of NAVBALTAP was to keep the Warsaw Pact's United Baltic Sea Fleets, consisting of the Soviet Baltic Fleet, Polish Navy and East German Volksmarine bottled up in the Baltic Sea by blocking the Danish straits and thus ensuring NATOs unchallenged control of the North Sea. To fulfill its mission NAVBALTAP commanded the entire German as well as the ships of the Royal Danish Navy based in Denmark. The ships based in Greenland and the Faroe islands were under the command of Supreme Allied Commander Atlantic.

 Flag Officer Denmark 

The Flag Officer Denmark (FOD) commanded the entire Danish home fleet. As the fleet's main tasks were to prevent Warsaw Pact naval forces from passing through the Danish straits and to prevent amphibious landings on the Danish coast. To fulfill its mission the Danish navy fielded a large number of minelayers and fast attack crafts. The first would have been used to mine all sealanes and potential landings beaches, while the latter would have harassed the enemy fleet with continuous hit and run attacks. Additionally the Danish navy fielded RGM-84 Harpoon anti-ship missiles mounted on Scania trucks as mobile coastal artillery.

The navy's main bases were 
Holmen Naval Base
Naval Station Frederikshavn 
Naval Station Korsør. 
Minor naval bases were 
Torpedo Station Kongsøre (base of the Frogman Corps and ) 
Marine Station Aarhus (base of the Danish Fleet Admiral)
Lyngsbæk Pier (naval mine depot and part of NEPS)
Marine Station Esbjerg (NATO Reinforce Port and part of NEPS)

The coastal fortification 
Stevnsfortet should control the southern entrance to Øresund  
Langelandsfortet should control the southern entrance to the Great Belt.
Minor naval stations, as part of sea surveillance.
Marine Station Møn
Marine Station Gedser
Marine Station Bornholm

Aerial support was provided by the Danish Naval Air Squadron (Søværnets Flyvetjeneste) based at Værløse Air Base with 8x Lynx Mk.80 helicopters.

The torpedo boats had a mobile base (MOBA) with approximately 40 trucks. MOBA LOG supplied fuel, ordnance, freshwater and provided repair facilities outside the naval bases. MOBA OPS had mobile radars for tactical surveillance and target acquisition.
  
At the beginning of 1989 the Danish navy consisted of the following ships.

 Fregateskadren FGE (Danish Frigate Squadron) 2nd Squadron from April 1992 
 Peder Skram-class frigate
 F352 Peder Skram 
 F353 Herluf Trolle
 Niels Juel-class corvette
 F354 Niels Juel
 F355 Olfert Fischer
 F356 Peter Tordenskiold
 Daphne-class (based on the British Ford-class seaward defence craft)
 P530 Daphne
 P531 Dryaden
 P533 Havfruen
 P534 Najaden
 P535 Nymfen
 P536 Neptun decommissioned October 30, 1989
 P537 Ran
 P538 Rota decommissioned October 31, 1989

 Torpedobådseskadren TBE (Danish Torpedo Boat Squadron) 4th Squadron from April 1992 
 Søløven-class fast torpedo boat
 P510 Søløven
 P511 Søridderen
 P512 Søbjørnen
 P513 Søhesten
 P514 Søhunden
 P515 Søulven
 Willemoes-class fast missile-torpedo boats
 P540 Bille
 P541 Bredal
 P542 Hammer
 P543 Huitfeldt
 P544 Krieger
 P545 Norby
 P546 Rodsteen
 P547 Sehested
 P548 Suenson
 P549 Willemoes
 Faxe-klassen oiler 
 A568 Rimfaxe 
 A569 Skinfaxe
 Mobile base for the torpedo boats (MOBA)

 Ubådseskadren UBE (Danish Submarine Squadron) 5th Squadron from April 1992 
 Narwhal-class submarine
 S320 Narhvalen
 S321 Nordkaperen
 Kobben-class submarine
 S322 Tumleren, bought from Norway, commissioned on October 20, 1989
 Delfin-class submarine
 S327 Spækhuggeren, decommissioned  July 31, 1989
 S329 Springeren

 Mineskibseskadren MSE (Danish Mine Ship Squadron) 3rd Squadron from April 1992 
 Lindormen-class cable minelayer
 N43 Lindormen
 N44 Lossen
 Falster-class minelayer
 N80 Falster
 N81 Fyen
 N82 Møen
 N83 Sjælland
 Sund-class minesweepers
 M572 Alssund decommissioned November 30, 1989
 M573 Egernsund decommissioned December 31, 1989
 M574 Grønsund
 M575 Guldborgsund
 M577 Ulvsund refitted as a minehunter, decommissioned  December 31, 1989
 M578 Vilsund

 Inspektionsskibseskadren ISE (Danish Fishery Protection Squadron) 1st Squadron from April 1992 
 Hvidbjørnen-class offshore patrol frigate 
 F348 Hvidbjørnen
 F349 Vædderen	
 F350 Ingolf
 F351 Fylla
 Beskytteren-class (an improved Hvidbjørnen-class) offshore patrol frigate
 F340 Beskytteren
 Agdlek-class arctic patrol cutter
 Y386 Agdlek
 Y387 Agpa
 Y388 Tulugaq

 Others 
 Flyvefisken-class patrol vessel - 2 more fitting out, replacing the Søløven, Daphne and Sund classes
 P550 Flyvefisken
 Barsø-class naval patrol cutter
 Y300 Barsø
 Y301 Drejø
 Y302 Romsø
 Y303 Samsø
 Y304 Thurø
 Y305 Vejrø
 Y306 Farø
 Y307 Læsø
 Y308 Rømø

Support ships:
 A559 Sleipner, transport ship

 Marinehjemmeværnet MHV Naval Home Guard 
 MH-90-class home guard cutters
 MHV 90 Bopa
 MHV 91 Brigaden
 MHV 92 Holger Danske
 MHV 93 Hvidsten
 MHV 94 Ringen
 MHV 95 Speditøren

 Flag Officer Germany 

The Flag Officer Germany (FOG) was the commanding vice admiral of the West-German Navy's Fleet Command. In peacetime he commanded all German naval units in the North and Baltic Sea. In case of war the command of German units in the North Sea would pass to the Commander German North Sea Subarea. Fleet Command was based during peacetime in Glücksburg, but would have moved to an underground command center in Glücksburg-Meierwik in case of war.

The German naval forces in the Baltic Sea had the task to prevent Warsaw Pact naval forces from passing through the Danish straits and to prevent amphibious landings on the German coast. To fulfill its mission the German navy fielded like the Danish navy a large number of minelayers and fast attack crafts. All German submarines were based in the Baltic Sea and tasked with mining enemy harbors and sinking enemy supply ships far from German waters. The main bases in the Baltic Sea were Naval Base Kiel, Naval Base Kiel-Holtenau, Naval Base Flensburg, Naval Base Flensburg-Mürwik, Naval Base Olpenitz, Neustadt Naval Base and Naval Base Eckernförde.
At the beginning of 1989 the Flag Officer Germany would have commanded the following ships. The peacetime administrative flotilla commands in Wilhelmshaven and Cuxhaven would have been removed from the chain of command in times of war.

 Fleet Command in Glücksburg
 Destroyer Flotilla in Wilhelmshaven
 1st Destroyer Squadron in Kiel with Lütjens-class destroyers
 D185 Lütjens
 D186 Mölders
 D187 Rommel
 Fleet Service Squadron in Flensburg-Mürwik with Thetis-class submarine chasers and Oste-class SIGINT/ELINT ships
 A1449 Hans Bürkner, command and control ship for the Thetis-class submarine chasers
 P6052 Thetis
 P6053 Hermes
 P6054 Najade
 P6055 Triton
 P6056 Theseus
 A50 Alster, commissioned October 1989
 A52 Oste
 A53 Oker
 Fast attack craft Flotilla in Flensburg-Mürwik
 2nd Fast Attack Craft Squadron in Olpenitz with Albatros-class fast attack craft
 P6111 Albatros
 P6112 Falke 
 P6113 Geier 
 P6114 Bussard 
 P6115 Sperber 
 P6116 Greif 
 P6117 Kondor 
 P6118 Seeadler 
 P6119 Habicht 
 P6120 Kormoran 
 A69 Donau, 401C-class supply and support tender
 3rd Fast Attack Craft Squadron in Flensburg-Mürwik with Tiger-class fast attack craft
 P6141 Tiger
 P6142 Iltis
 P6143 Luchs
 P6144 Marder
 P6145 Leopard
 P6146 Fuchs
 P6147 Jaguar
 P6148 Löwe
 P6149 Wolf
 P6150 Panther
 A58 Rhein, 401C-class supply and support tender
 5th Fast Attack Craft Squadron in Olpenitz with Tiger-class fast attack craft
 P6151 Häher
 P6152 Storch
 P6153 Pelikan
 P6154 Elster
 P6155 Alk
 P6156 Dommel
 P6157 Weihe
 P6158 Pinguin
 P6159 Reiher
 P6160 Kranich
 A63 Main, 401C-class supply and support tender
 7th Fast Attack Craft Squadron in Kiel with Gepard-class fast attack craft
 P6121 Gepard
 P6122 Puma
 P6123 Hermelin
 P6124 Nerz
 P6125 Zobel
 P6126 Frettchen
 P6127 Dachs
 P6128 Ozelot
 P6129 Wiesel
 P6130 Hyäne
 A61 Elbe, 401D-class supply and support tender
 A66 Neckar, 401B-class supply and support tender, decommissioned November 1989
 Mine Countermeasures Flotilla in Wilhelmshaven
 Mine Diver Company in Eckernförde
 1st Minesweeping Squadron in Flensburg with Schütze-class fast minesweepers
 M1051 Castor
 M1054 Pollux
 M1055 Sirius
 M1056 Rigel
 M1057 Regulus
 M1058 Mars
 M1059 Spica
 M1060 Skorpion
 M1062 Schütze
 M1063 Waage
 A1437 Sachsenwald, 762-class naval mine transport ship
 A1438 Steigerwald, 762-class naval mine transport ship
 3rd Minesweeping Squadron in Kiel with Ariadne-class coastal minesweepers
 M2650 Ariadne
 M2651 Freya
 M2652 Vineta
 M2653 Hertha
 M2654 Nymphe
 M2655 Nixe
 M2656 Amazone
 M2657 Gazelle
 5th Minesweeping Squadron in Olpenitz, between 1988 and 1991 the squadron's Schütze-class fast minesweepers were replaced with Hameln-class fast minesweepers 
 M1064 Deneb, decommissioned September 1989
 M1065 Jupiter, decommissioned September 1989
 M1093 Neptun
 M1094 Widder, decommissioned July 1989
 M1096 Fische, decommissioned April 1989
 M1092 Hameln, commissioned June 1989
 M1095 Überherrn, commissioned September 1989
 M1097 Laboe, commissioned December 1989
 A67 Mosel, 402A-class supply and support tender
 7th Minesweeping Squadron in Neustadt with Frauenlob-class minesweepers
 M2658 Frauenlob
 M2659 Nautilus
 M2660 Gefion
 M2661 Medusa
 M2662 Undine
 M2663 Minerva
 M2664 Diana
 M2665 Loreley
 M2666 Atlantis
 M2667 Acheron
 Submarine Flotilla in Kiel
 1st Submarine Squadron in Kiel with Type 205 and Type 206 submarines
 S170 / U21
 S176 / U27
 S180 / U1 (Type 205)
 S181 / U2 (Type 205)
 S188 / U9 (Type 205)
 S189 / U10 (Type 205)
 S190 / U11 (Type 205A)
 S191 / U12 (Type 205B)
 S192 / U13
 S193 / U14
 S198 / U19
 S199 / U20
 A55 Lahn, 403B-class supply and support tender
 3rd Submarine Squadron in Eckernförde with Type 206 submarines
 S171 / U22
 S172 / U23
 S173 / U24
 S174 / U25
 S175 / U26
 S177 / U28
 S178 / U29
 S179 / U30
 S194 / U15
 S195 / U16
 S196 / U17
 S197 / U18
 A56 Lech, 403B-class supply and support tender, decommissioned June 1989
 Supply Flotilla in Cuxhaven
 1st Supply Squadron in Kiel, in wartime six additional transport ships and a fuel ship would be activated from the Navy's reserve.
 Naval Base Kiel
 A1407 Wittensee, 763-class fuel transport ship
 A1412 Coburg, 701-class supply ship
 A1417 Offenburg, 701A-class supply ship
 A1442 Spessart, 704A-class fuel transport ship
 A1452 Spiekeroog, 722B-class ocean going tug
 Naval Base Flensburg-Mürwik
 A1424 Walchensee, 703-class fuel transport ship
 A1428 Harz, 766-class fuel transport ship
 A1435 Westerwald, 760-class ammunition transport ship
 Naval Base Olpenitz
 A1411 Lüneburg, 701A-class supply ship
 A1415 Saarburg, 701C-class supply ship
 A1418 Meersburg, 701C-class supply ship
 A1425 Ammersee, 703-class fuel transport ship
 A1455 Norderney, 722B-class ocean going tug
 Y847 Odin, maintenance ship
 Neustadt Naval Base
 A1458 Fehmarn, 720B-class salvage tug
 Amphibious Group in Kiel
 Combat Swimmers Company in Eckernförde
 Beachmaster Company in Eckernförde with 521-class LCMs
 L780 Hummer
 L782 Krabbe
 L783 Auster
 L784 Muschel
 L785 Koralle
 L788 Butt (Barbe-class utility landing craft)
 L789 Brasse (Barbe-class utility landing craft)
 Landing Craft Group in Kiel with Barbe-class utility landing crafts
 L760 Flunder
 L761 Karpfen
 L762 Lachs
 L763 Plötze
 L764 Rochen
 L765 Schlei
 L766 Stör
 L767 Tümmler
 L768 Wels
 L769 Zander
 L790 Barbe
 L791 Delphin
 L792 Dorsch
 L793 Felchen
 L794 Forelle
 L796 Makrele
 L797 Muräne

 Commander German North Sea Subarea 

The Commander German North Sea Subarea (GERNORSEA) was the commanding Flottillenadmiral (equivalent to a US Navy Rear admiral (Lower Half)) of the West-German Navy's fleet in the North Sea. In peacetime he was subordinate to the vice admiral commanding West-German Navy's Fleet Command, but in case of war he command a parallel command under NAVBALTAP. In peacetime the command was based in Wilhelmshaven, but would have moved to an underground command center in Wilhelmshaven-Sengwarden in case of war.

While German naval forces in Baltic Sea were tasked with preventing Warsaw Pact naval forces from passing through the Danish straits, the North Sea fleet was to patrol the German Bight and protect allied reinforcements and shipping heading for German ports. To GERNORSEA's East Allied Command Channel's BENECHAN command was tasked with patrolling the Western half of the Southern North Sea, while to North Allied Forces Northern Europe's SONOR command was patrolling the Southern Norwegian coast. Unlike in the Baltic Sea most vessels of GERNORSEA were destroyers and frigates. The main bases in the North Sea were Naval Base Wilhelmshaven and Naval Base Cuxhaven.

At the beginning of 1989 the Commander German North Sea Subarea would have commanded the following ships in wartime:

 Commander German North Sea Subarea in Sengwarden
 Destroyer Flotilla in Wilhelmshaven
 2nd Destroyer Squadron in Wilhelmshaven with Hamburg-class destroyers
 D181 Hamburg
 D182 Schleswig-Holstein
 D183 Bayern
 D184 Hessen
 2nd Frigate Squadron in Wilhelmshaven, between 1988 and 1990 the squadron replaced its Köln-class frigates with Bremen-class frigates
 F211 Köln
 F212 Karlsruhe
 F213 Augsburg, commissioned October 1989
 F214 Lübeck, fitting out, commissioned March 1990
 F225 Braunschweig, last Köln-class frigate in service, decommissioned July 1989
 4th Frigate Squadron in Wilhelmshaven with Bremen-class frigates
 F207 Bremen 
 F208 Niedersachsen
 F209 Rheinland-Pfalz
 F210 Emden
 Mine Countermeasures Flotilla in Wilhelmshaven
 4th Minesweeping Squadron in Wilhelmshaven with Lindau-class minehunters
 M1070 Göttingen
 M1071 Koblenz
 M1072 Lindau
 M1074 Tübingen
 M1075 Wetzlar
 M1077 Weilheim
 M1078 Cuxhaven
 M1080 Marburg
 M1084 Flensburg
 M1085 Minden
 M1086 Fulda
 M1087 Völklingen
 6th Minesweeping Squadron in Wilhelmshaven with 351-class minesweepers (improved Lindau-class minesweepers)
 M1073 Schleswig
 M1076 Paderborn
 M1079 Düren
 M1081 Konstanz
 M1082 Wolfsburg
 M1083 Ulm
 A68 Werra, 401A-class supply and support tender
 A1410 Walther Von Ledebur, mine diver support vessel
 Supply Flotilla in Cuxhaven
 2nd Supply Squadron''' in Wilhelmshaven, in wartime two additional two fuel transport ships and nine hospital ships would be activated from the Navy's reserve.
 A1413 Freiburg, 701E-class supply ship
 A1414 Glücksburg, 701C-class supply ship
 A1416 Nienburg, 701A-class supply ship
 A1426 Tegernsee, 703-class fuel transport ship
 A1427 Westensee, 703-class fuel transport ship
 A1429 Eifel, 766-class fuel transport ship
 A1436 Odenwald, 760-class ammunition transport ship
 A1443 Rhön, 704A-class fuel transport ship
 A1451 Wangerooge, 722C-class ocean going tug
 A1457 Helgoland, 720A-class salvage tug
 Y848 Wotan, maintenance ship

1993 to 2002
On 1 October 1993, a restructuring took effect, which took into account the changed military situation in the Baltic Sea. Whilst the two land forces commands remained in place, the two headquarters of the naval and air forces were deactivated. The Interim Combined Air Operations Centre 1 (ICAOC 1) in Karup took the place of COMAIRBALTAP. The two national naval commanders were placed directly under COMBALTAP as Admiral Danish Fleet (AdmDanFleet) and Commander German Fleet (COMGERFLEET).

Commanders

References

Sources

Peter Monte, Die Rolle der Marine der Bundesrepublik Deutschland in der Verteidigungsplanung für Mittel- und Nordeuropa von den 50er Jahren bis zur Wende 1989/90; in: Werner Rahn (Hrsg.), Deutsche Marinen im Wandel, S. 565 ff.. München 2005. 
Norbert Rath; Headquarter Allied Forces Baltic Approaches (HQ BALTAP); in Marineforum 4–1997, S. 3ff.

Literature 
Thomas-Durell Young, Command in NATO After the Cold War: Alliance, National and Multinational Considerations

External links
 BALTAP

Formations of the NATO Military Command Structure 1952–1994
Formations of the NATO Military Command Structure 1994–present
Military units and formations established in 1962
Military history of Europe